Miss World USA 1969 was the 8th edition of the Miss World USA pageant and it was held in the Baltimore Civic Center in Baltimore, Maryland and was won by Gail Renshaw of Virginia. She was crowned by outgoing titleholder, Johnine Leigh Avery of Washington. Renshaw went on to represent the United States at the Miss World 1969 Pageant in London later that year. She finished as 1st Runner-Up at Miss World. After competing at Miss World, Renshaw resigned her title to get married. Renshaw was replaced by Connie Lee Haggard of Texas who was the 1st Runner-Up of Miss World USA.

This edition was also the first edition where cities were no longer represented. From this point forward, delegates representing cities have to compete in and win state pageants first before competing at Miss World USA.

Results

Placements

∞ Renshaw resigned the Miss World USA title after competing at Miss World to get married. Due to protocol, Connie Lee Haggard became Miss World USA

Delegates
The Miss World USA 1969 delegates were:

 Arizona - Donna Kay Smith
 Arkansas - Kimberly Torres
 California - Vickie Ann Siggers
 Colorado - Alana Rank
 Connecticut - Patricia Conger
 Delaware - Mary Lou Wirth
 District of Columbia - Hope Hasty
 Florida - Deborah Anyzeski
 Georgia - Marcia A. Shrawder
 Hawaii - Cyndi Jean Ozenne
 Idaho - Kay E. Miller
 Illinois - Patsy Whitecotton
 Indiana - Mary Jean Hamilton
 Iowa - Patricia Ann Horning
 Kentucky - Connie Albertson
 Louisiana - Marlin Ann Bourg
 Maine - Betina M. Tilton
 Maryland - Paulette Reck
 Michigan - Jonn Ricca
 Minnesota - Pam Doty
 Nebraska - Ann E. Pettis
 Nevada - Leanna Johnson
 New Hampshire - Eileen O’Connor
 New Jersey - Susan Albowitz
 New Mexico - Heidemarie R. Rathke
 New York - Gloria E. Graham
 North Dakota - Michele S. Lenzmeier
 Ohio - Wendy Ann Belus
 Oregon - Wanda Larsen
 Pennsylvania - Sherry Kaminski
 Rhode Island - Beverly Ann Mendillo
 South Carolina - Carolyn Vernon
 Texas - Connie Lee Haggard
 Utah - Kathleen Hadden
 Vermont - Valentina Donna Mancuso
 Virginia - Gail Renshaw
 Washington - Marie Albertson
 West Virginia - Barbara Ivady

Notes

Did not Compete

Crossovers
Contestants who competed in other beauty pageants:

Miss USA
1968: : Paulette Reck (1st Runner-Up)

References

External links
Miss World Official Website
Miss World America Official Website

1969 in the United States
World America
1969
1969 in Maryland